Eduardus Johannes Petrus van Meeuwen ('s-Hertogenbosch, 12 September 1802 – 's-Hertogenbosch, 8 October 1873) was a Dutch politician from a Catholic family. In 1834, with his father, he was created a member of the lower nobility by King William I of the Netherlands with the title of jonkheer.

Van Meeuwen, a son of Petrus Andreas van Meeuwen, was to become president of the Senate of the Netherlands. In 1846 he was made governor of Limburg, the last with this official title; the function is now called King's (or Queen's) commissioner.

1802 births
1873 deaths
Jonkheers of the Netherlands
Dutch Roman Catholics
Presidents of the Senate (Netherlands)
Members of the Senate (Netherlands)
People from 's-Hertogenbosch
King's and Queen's Commissioners of Limburg